The 1950 Pittsburgh Steelers season was the franchise's 18th season in the National Football League (NFL). It was the team's third season under head coach John Michelosen who had led the team to a combined 10–13–1 record over the previous two years.

Despite finishing last in the league in scoring, the team compiled a 6–6 record which left them tied for third place among the six teams in the NFL's American Conference. The Steelers were the league's only team that employed the single wing; most of the league's other franchises had switched to the T formation.

Regular season

Schedule

Standings

Game summaries

Week 1 (Sunday September 17, 1950): New York Giants 

at Forbes Field, Pittsburgh, Pennsylvania

 Game time: 2:00 pm
 Game weather: Clear, mid- to high-sixties
 Game attendance: 24,699
 Referee: John Glascott (University of Pennsylvania)  
 Radio announcer: Joe Tucker (WPIT)  
 TV announcer: not televised

Scoring Drives:
 New York Giants – Safety, Hartley tackled in end zone by Roberts
 Pittsburgh – Shipkey 1 run (Geri kick)
 New York Giants – Safety, punt snapped out of end zone
 New York Giants – Landry 37 fumble run (Poole kick)
 New York Giants – DeRogatis fumble recovery in end zone (Poole kick)

Week 2 (Sunday September 24, 1950): Detroit Lions  

at University of Detroit Stadium, Detroit, Michigan

 Game time: 2:00 pm
 Game weather: cold and dreary
 Game attendance: 18,707 
 Referee: Yans Wallace 
 Radio announcer: Joe Tucker (WPIT)  
 TV announcer: not televised

Scoring Drives:
 Pittsburgh – Nickel 43 pass from Gage (Geri kick)
 Detroit – Walker 11 pass from Layne (Walker kick)
 Detroit – FG Walker 20

Week 3 (Sunday October 1, 1950): Washington Redskins  

at Griffith Stadium, Washington, DC

 Game time: 2:00pm
 Game weather: Hot, sunny
 Game attendance: 25,008 
 Referee: Sam Giangreco 
 Radio announcer: Joe Tucker (WPIT)
 TV announcer: not televised

Scoring Drives:
 Washington – Taylor 70 pass from Gilmer (Dudley kick)
 Pittsburgh – FG Geri 40
 Pittsburgh – Gage 5 run (Geri kick)
 Pittsburgh – Nickel 28 pass from Geri (Geri kick)

Week 4 (Saturday October 7, 1950): Cleveland Browns  

at Forbes Field, Pittsburgh, Pennsylvania

 Game time: evening 
 Game weather: 
 Game attendance: 35,399
 Referee: 
 TV announcers:

Scoring Drives:

 Pittsburgh – Geri 30-yard FG
 Cleveland – Graham 1 run (Groza kick)
 Cleveland – Graham 1 run (Groza kick)
 Cleveland – Jones 7 run (Groza kick)
 Cleveland – Safety, Chandnois tackled in end zone by Kissell
 Pittsburgh – Seabright 13 pass from Geri (Geri kick)
 Cleveland – Jones 48 run (Groza kick)
 Pittsburgh – Shipkey 1 run (Geri kick)

Week 5 (Sunday October 15, 1950): New York Giants  

at Polo Grounds, New York, New York

 Game time: 
 Game weather: 
 Game attendance: 21,725
 Referee: 
 TV announcers:

Scoring Drives:

 Pittsburgh – Nickel 58 pass from Geri (Geri kick)
 Pittsburgh – FG Geri 21
 New York Giants – Scott 33 pass from Conerly (kick failed)
 Pittsburgh – Shipkey 1 run (Geri kick)

Week 6 (Sunday October 22, 1950): Philadelphia Eagles  

at Forbes Field, Pittsburgh, Pennsylvania

 Game time: 2:00pm
 Game weather: 
 Game attendance: 35,662
 Referee: 
 TV announcers:

Scoring Drives:

 Philadelphia – Willey 41 interception (Patton kick)
 Pittsburgh – Rogel 64 pass from Geri (Geri kick)
 Pittsburgh – FG Geri 24
 Philadelphia – FG Patton 23
 Philadelphia – Van Buren 5 run (Patton kick)

Week 7 (Sunday October 29, 1950): Cleveland Browns  

at Cleveland Municipal Stadium, Cleveland, Ohio

 Game time: 
 Game weather: 
 Game attendance: 40,714
 Referee: 
 TV announcers:

Scoring Drives:

 Cleveland – Graham 1 run (Groza kick)
 Cleveland – FG Groza 13
 Cleveland – Motley 33 pass from Graham (Groza kick)
 Cleveland – Motley 69 run (Groza kick)
 Cleveland – Phelps 14 run (Groza kick)
 Pittsburgh – Gage 29 pass from Gasparella (Geri kick)
 Cleveland – Jones 80 pass from Graham (Groza kick)
 Cleveland – Gillom 38 pass from Lewis (Groza kick)

Week 8 (Sunday November 5, 1950): Philadelphia Eagles  

at Shibe Park, Philadelphia, Pennsylvania

 Game time: 
 Game weather: 
 Game attendance: 24,629
 Referee: 
 TV announcers:

Scoring Drives:

 Pittsburgh – FG Geri 11
 Philadelphia – Van Buren 1 run (Patton kick)
 Pittsburgh – FG Geri 36
 Pittsburgh – FG Geri 13

Week 9 (Sunday November 12, 1950): Baltimore Colts  

at Forbes Field, Pittsburgh, Pennsylvania

 Game time: 
 Game weather: 
 Game attendance: 24,141
 Referee: 
 TV announcers:

Scoring Drives:

 Pittsburgh – FG Geri 37
 PIttsburgh – Rogel 15 run (Geri kick)
 Pittsburgh – Gage 1 run (Geri kick)
 Baltimore – Spaniel 15 run (Grossman kick)

Week 11 (Thursday November 23, 1950): Chicago Cardinals  

at Comiskey Park, Chicago, Illinois

 Game time: 
 Game weather: 
 Game attendance: 11,622
 Referee: 
 TV announcers:

Scoring Drives:

 Pittsburgh – Geri 5 run (Geri kick)
 Chicago Cardinals – FG Harder 18
 Pittsburgh – Geri 4 run (Geri kick)
 Pittsburgh – Nuzum 1 run (Geri kick)
 Pittsburgh – Gage 13 run (Geri kick)
 Chicago Cardinals – Shaw 45 pass from Hardy (Harder kick)
 Chicago Cardinals – Polsfoot 22 pass from Hardy (Harder kick)

Week 12 (Sunday December 3, 1950): Washington Redskins  

at Forbes Field, Pittsburgh, Pennsylvania

 Game time: 
 Game weather: 
 Game attendance: 19,741
 Referee: 
 TV announcers:

Scoring Drives:

 Washington – Dudley 96 punt return (Dudley kick)
 Washington – Saenz 34 pass from Baugh (Dudley kick)
 Washington – FG Dudley 15
 Washington – Goode 5 run (Dudley kick)
 Pittsburgh – Nickel 65 pass from Geri (Geri kick)

Week 13 (Sunday December 10, 1950): Chicago Cardinals  

at Forbes Field, Pittsburgh, Pennsylvania

 Game time: 
 Game weather: 
 Game attendance: 18,301
 Referee: 
 TV announcers:

Scoring Drives:

 Chicago Cardinals – Shaw 7 pass from Hardy (Harder kick)
 Pittsburgh – Rogel 40 run (Geri kick)
 Pittsburgh – Geri 33 pass from Gasparella (Geri kick)
 Pittsburgh – Nuzum 10 lateral from Nickel after 68 pass from Geri (Geri kick)
 Pittsburgh – Gage 48 pass from Gasparella (Geri kick)

References

Pittsburgh Steelers seasons
Pittsburgh Steelers
Pitts